CSM Oradea is a men's handball team based in Oradea, Bihor County, Romania. It competes in the 2020-2021 Divizia A seria D season.

Kits

Honours
Divizia A:
Winners  (1): 2016-2017 
Divizia A:
Winners  (1): 2017-2018 
Divizia A:
Winners  (1): 2018-2019 
Divizia A:
Winners  (1): 2019-2020 
Divizia A:
 Place (6): 2020-2021

Team

Current squad  

Goalkeepers
   Robert Ene
   George Duma
   Denis Indrie
   Patrick Baltazar Cioc
Wingers
   Ghiță Mateiaș
   Poteră Alexandru
   Farcas Alexandru
   Baban Ionuț
   Ștefan Bandi
   Mlinarksik Marius
Line players
   Gal Iulian
   Gabriel Lari
   Ionuț Huțan

Back players
LB
   Csongor Szasz
CB
   Răzvan Radu
   Szakacs Apor
RB
   Breban George
   Eduard Szilágyi

See also
 CSM Oradea

References

External links
 

 
Handball clubs established in 2003 
Romanian handball clubs
Sport in Oradea
2003 establishments in Romania